Philip Sidney Snow (2 July 1907 – 13 February 1985) was an English first-class cricketer.

Snow was born at Kendal in July 1907. He was educated at Shrewsbury School, before going up to Brasenose College, Oxford. While studying at Oxford, he made two appearances in first-class cricket for Oxford University against Lancashire in 1928, and Nottinghamshire in 1929. He scored 44 runs in his two appearances, with a high score of 22. A bowler who bowled a combination of right-arm medium pace and off break, he took 5 wickets with best figures of 2 for 31. Snow died at Reading in February 1985.

References

External links

1907 births
1985 deaths
Sportspeople from Kendal
Cricketers from Cumbria
People educated at Shrewsbury School
Alumni of Brasenose College, Oxford
English cricketers
Oxford University cricketers